The 3rd BC Card Cup World Baduk Championship began on 29 January 2011 and concluded 28 April 2011 with Lee Sedol winning his second straight title.

Tournament
All players are representatives of South Korea unless otherwise noted.

Finals

References

2011 in go
International Go competitions